Turnberry is a golf resort on the Firth of Clyde in Ayrshire, southwest Scotland. It comprises three links golf courses, a golf academy, a five-star James Miller-designed hotel from 1906, along with lodge and cottage accommodations.

Turnberry was a popular golf course and resort from its inception, made accessible because of the Maidens and Dunure Light Railway. It closed in both World Wars for military use, and there was concern it would not open following World War II, but it was redesigned by Mackenzie Ross and re-opened in 1951. The course was the scene of the 1977 Open Championship, where Tom Watson scored a close victory over Jack Nicklaus. The property has been owned by the Trump Organization since 2014, who now brand the course Trump Turnberry.

Location

It is sited on headland along the Firth of Clyde, overlooking the Isle of Arran and Ailsa Craig.

History

Development

The idea of the course came from Archibald Kennedy, 3rd Marquess of Ailsa after the announcement of the Maidens and Dunure Light Railway in 1899. The line would follow the Ayrshire coastline from Ayr to Girvan. The Marquess owned  of land at Turnberry Green, south of Maidens, which was infertile and unsuitable for agriculture, and therefore an ideal golf course location. He realised the new railway would provide easy access for people wanting to visit a quality course. Following the construction of the line, he asked 1883 Open Championship winner Willie Fernie to design a suitable course. Fernie designed an initial round of 13 holes in 1901, with a second-round following later.

The hotel was designed by station architect James Miller, whose other work included  and  railway stations. It was built adjacent to the railway, and opened concurrently with the station on 17 May 1906.  The course was intended to attract visitors from across Britain, and was advertised heavily in the national press.

The property was used as an airbase in World War I, and a landing strip built for this purpose still exists, now disused. The Royal Flying Corps trained pilots in the arts of aerial gunnery and combat, and the Turnberry Hotel was used as a hospital for the wounded. After the war, courses 1 and 2 were rebuilt and renamed "Ailsa" and "Arran". A memorial to honour lost airmen was erected on the hill overlooking the ninth hole of Ailsa, which is still standing.

The cycle was repeated for World War II. The hotel was commissioned as a hospital, and the golf courses were seconded for air training for the Royal Air Force (RAF); it is thought that as many as 200 died at the base.

The hotel and golf course was served by its own dedicated railway station. Turnberry railway station opened in 1906 and operated until 1942, when the Maidens and Dunure Light Railway line was partially closed.

Following the war, the course was in need of refurbishment and the hotel was in a dilapidated state. Frank Hole, chairman of British Transport Hotels, convinced the Government that golf courses should be rebuilt and restored. The architect Mackenzie Ross rebuilt the course, removing the wartime runways and covering the land with sand and topsoil. Ross is credited with restoring the courses to their high quality, and the Ailsa course was re-opened in 1951, a seaside links with views of Ailsa Craig and the Isle of Arran.

Starwood acquired the hotel in 1997, and until 2008, was operated under the Westin Hotels & Resorts brand. In 2008, Leisurecorp, Dubai World's sport and leisure subsidiary purchased the resort, with Starwood continuing to manage operations under The Luxury Collection brand.

Trump ownership
Donald Trump purchased the hotel and golf courses from Leisurecorp in 2014 for $60 million, and the resort was renamed Trump Turnberry. Trump resigned his directorship of the companies which own Trump Turnberry in 2017, just before he was inaugurated as President of the United States, and passed control to his sons Donald Jr and Eric. The Trump Organization claims to have spent about two hundred million dollars on renovating the course; $18m were accounted for in 2016.  Donald Trump remains the owner of Golf Recreation Scotland, which in turn owns SLC Turnberry.

Financing for Trump's golf courses came under scrutiny in the Special Counsel investigation into Russian interference in the 2016 United States elections. Glenn Simpson testified before Congress that "enormous amounts of capital [was] flowing into these projects from unknown sources and – or at least on paper it says it’s from the Trump Organisation, but it’s hundreds of millions of dollars. And these golf courses are just, you know, they’re sinks. They don’t actually make any money."

In September 2019, it was reported that the House Oversight and Reform Committee of the United States Congress was investigating increased military expenditure at Glasgow Prestwick Airport that might constitute a conflict of interest in regard the Trump Turnberry golf course.  Although stopovers by Air Force flight crews to the airport were still lower than 2007 levels, it was reported September 2019 that the Pentagon had spent nearly $200,000 at Turnberry since Trump took office.

After the 2021 United States Capitol attack, the organizer of the championship, The R&A, announced that The Open would not be held again at Turnberry as long as its links to the Trump Organization remain.

Courses

The Ailsa Course, redesigned by Mackenzie Ross between 1949 and 1951, and again by Martin Ebert between 2015 and 2016, has staged The Open Championship on four occasions (1977, 1986, 1994, and 2009). It has also hosted many other important golf tournaments, including the Women's British Open in 2002, the Walker Cup in 1963, the Amateur Championship in 1961, 1983, 1996, and 2008, and the Senior Open Championship on seven occasions, 1987–90, 2003, 2006, and 2012. The Ailsa Course is featured in the 2004 golf video game Tiger Woods PGA Tour 2005.

The other two courses at Turnberry are the King Robert the Bruce course and the nine-hole Arran course. The Kintyre Course, opened in 2001 and existed at the resort until it was replaced by the King Robert the Bruce course in 2017.  The Kintyre Course was designed by Donald Steel and built on the foundations of the old Arran layout, which had been rebuilt along with the Ailsa Course following World War II.  During the war, the resort was used as a hospital and the courses were flattened and paved for use as a major RAF airfield. The new Arran Course opened in 2002.

Other golf facilities at the resort include the Colin Montgomerie Links Golf Academy and a pitch and putt course.

In 2003, the 18th hole on the Ailsa Course, "Ailsa Hame", was renamed "Duel in the Sun" as homage to the battle between Tom Watson and Jack Nicklaus in 1977; this is also the name of a sports bar at the resort.  In 2009, Watson, 59, held a one-shot lead when he bogeyed this hole in the final round, eventually losing the Open Championship in a playoff.

Ailsa Course scorecard
The official names are:

The Open Championship

At its first Open Championship in 1977, the course was the scene of the famous "Duel in the Sun", when Tom Watson claimed a classic victory, one stroke ahead of Jack Nicklaus.

The two were paired during the final two rounds and finished well ahead of the rest of the field.  They posted identical scores for the first three rounds, and were tied through the 16th hole of the final round. Nicklaus missed a short birdie putt on the par-5 17th hole to tie Watson, who had reached in two and birdied. On the par-4 18th hole, Nicklaus recovered from the rough and sank a lengthy birdie putt, which forced Watson to sink his short birdie putt to win, which he did. It was the second of Watson's five Open titles; down two strokes on the 13th tee, he bested Nicklaus by three shots over the final six holes.

Nine years later in 1986, Greg Norman claimed the first of his two Opens (his only major titles), winning by five strokes. Nick Price won his second major (and only Open) in 1994, a single stroke ahead of runner-up Jesper Parnevik.

After a fifteen-year absence, the Ailsa Course hosted the Open in 2009, where 59-year-old Watson nearly won his sixth Open Championship. Up by a stroke at the 72nd hole, his approach shot took an unfortunate bounce on the front of the green, then ran off the back and led to a bogey.  Watson then lost a four-hole playoff with Stewart Cink by six strokes; Cink birdied the 72nd hole and then posted two pars and two birdies in the playoff to win his only major title.

In 2015, the governing body for Golf, The R&A, announced that the 2020 Open Championship would not be played at Turnberry, even though it had previously been considered likely to host the tournament. The R&A were unimpressed with several remarks by Donald Trump; one member said he would like Turnberry to host the Open again, but "not Trump Turnberry". In February 2018 the U.S. Ambassador to Britain, Robert Wood "Woody" Johnson IV, told colleagues that he had been instructed by then-President Trump to seek British government help in securing the British Open for Turnberry. Although advised not to do so by his deputy, Lewis Lukens, he reportedly did suggest to David Mundell, the Secretary of State for Scotland, that the Open be moved to Turnberry. However, a later British government statement said that Johnson "made no request of Mr. Mundell regarding the British Open or any other sporting event."

Following the 2021 storming of the United States Capitol, the R&A announced that it had no plans to stage any of its competitions at Turnberry and would not do so "until we are convinced that the focus will be on the championship, the players and the course itself".

The Open Championship winners at Turnberry, all played on the par-70 Ailsa Course:

Note: For multiple winners of The Open Championship, superscript ordinal identifies which in their respective careers.

The Senior Open Championship
Winners of The Senior Open Championship at Turnberry.

Women's British Open
Winner of the Women's British Open at Turnberry.

See also
 Donald Trump and golf
 List of things named after Donald Trump

References
Citations

Sources

External links

Photo Tour of Turnberry
Satellite Images of the golf course

1906 establishments in Scotland
Assets owned by the Trump Organization
Donald Trump real estate
Golf clubs and courses in South Ayrshire
Hotels established in 1906
Hotel buildings completed in 1906
The Open Championship venues
Sports venues in South Ayrshire
Walker Cup venues
Five star hotels